Piboserod is a selective 5-HT4 receptor antagonist which was marketed and manufactured by GlaxoSmithKline (GSK) under the trade name Serlipet for the management of atrial fibrillation and irritable bowel syndrome. In 2007 the Norwegian company Bio-Medisinsk Innovasjon AS (BMI) completed a clinical phase II study to investigate the effect of piboserod in patients with chronic heart failure.

Mechanism of action
In 2002 a research group at the University of Oslo discovered that muscles from the ventricle of failing hearts have increased responsiveness to serotonin. They later demonstrated that the effect was due to an expression of functional 5-HT4 receptors in the failing muscle. On the basis of these findings, and in analogy with the success of betablockers in heart failure, the group made the hypothesis that 5-HT4 receptor antagonists could be useful to treat heart failure. Their hypothesis was tested in animal models of heart failure with positive results.

References 

5-HT4 antagonists
Piperidines
Carboxamides
Indoles
GSK plc brands